Alhassane Keita (born 16 April 1992) is a Guinean professional footballer who plays for Belenenses SAD.

Club career
He made his first professional appearance for Club Industriel de Kamsar, and played as a striker for FC Metz in the French Ligue 2.

International career
He played in the Coupe d'Afrique U17 in 2009 in Algeria. He made his debut for the senior Guinea national football team in a friendly 1-2 win over Cameroon on 28 March 2017.

References

External links
 

1992 births
Living people
Sportspeople from Conakry
Association football forwards
Guinean footballers
Guinea international footballers
Guinean expatriate footballers
FC Metz players
US Boulogne players
Lierse S.K. players
Ermis Aradippou FC players
Belenenses SAD players
Riffa SC players
Ligue 2 players
Championnat National players
Belgian Pro League players
Cypriot First Division players
Primeira Liga players
Expatriate footballers in France
Expatriate footballers in Belgium
Expatriate footballers in Cyprus
Expatriate footballers in Portugal
Expatriate footballers in Bahrain
Guinea youth international footballers